Glutamicibacter endophyticus is a Gram-positive, aerobic and non-motile bacterium from the genus Glutamicibacter which has been isolated from the roots of the plant Salsola affinis in Urumqi, China.

References 

Bacteria described in 2015
Micrococcaceae